John F. Kennedy Memorial High School was a public secondary school in Mound Bayou, Mississippi, United States, serving grades 7–12. At the end of its life it was in the North Bolivar Consolidated School District, and was formerly in the Mound Bayou Public School District.

Located at 204 Edwards Street, the school served students in grades seven through twelve from Mound Bayou, Winstonville, and surrounding areas.

The school's mascot was the Hornet.

History
On July 1, 2014, the North Bolivar School District consolidated with the Mound Bayou Public School District to form the North Bolivar Consolidated School District.

Closure
In January 2018 the school district's board voted 3–2 to close Kennedy High. Even though Kennedy High had lower maintenance costs than Broad Street High School, meaning a renovation of Kennedy, compared to the other school, would cost $1 million fewer, the board kept the Broad Street campus opened as it had more space. As three of the five board members of the consolidated district were from the former Shelby-based North Bolivar school district, the representatives of that district had full control of the entire district. Kelsey Davis Betz of Mississippi Today wrote "If the high school closes, some fear the town’s sense of identity and remaining vitality will be weakened."

In March of that year residents began to consider legal action to force the state to keep Kennedy HS open. That month residents filed an injunction to a judge asking for the closure to be stopped. A judge in July temporarily ruled that the school should be kept in operation. However JFK HS closed August 2018 after the Mississippi Supreme Court confirmed the closure. The court ruling was two days before the start of classes. It was consolidated into Northside High School, on the campus of the former Broad Street High.

Demographics
There were a total of 321 students enrolled in John F. Kennedy Memorial High during the 2006–2007 school year. The gender makeup of the school was 52% female and 48% male. The racial makeup of the school was 100.00% African American.

At the time of closure the enrollment was about 250.

Curriculum
The teachers taught about the history of Mound Bayou, which was co-founded by free African Americans.

Performance
For the 2017–2018 school year its graduation rate was 82.5%.

See also
List of high schools in Mississippi
List of school districts in Mississippi

References

External links
 - North Bolivar School District
 - Mound Bayou School District

Public high schools in Mississippi
Public middle schools in Mississippi
Schools in Bolivar County, Mississippi
Mound Bayou, Mississippi
2018 disestablishments in Mississippi
Educational institutions disestablished in 2018
Monuments and memorials to John F. Kennedy in the United States